Spartacus Rugby Union Football Club, is a Rugby Union team in Gothenburg, Sweden, playing in the top Swedish League.

History 

Spartacus Rugby Union Football Club was founded in 1968. At the driving seat were Göran Olsson, John Phelan and Willard Sartre. Back in those days, Spartacus only had a senior men’s team. The situation is the same today, but of recent years we have had successful ladies and youth teams also.

Today they have one senior team which is going through a generation change. The team mostly consists of players who have come up through the Spartacus “youth academy” but there is currently a strong foreign contingency within the club, with players from such major rugby nations as England, Ireland, France, New Zealand and Fiji.  In early 2006, Spartacus acquired a new coach in the form of Jonas Ahl (who is also coach of the Swedish national ladies team) and with Ahl’s expert coaching and guidance, we gained promotion to Allsvenskan, the top league in Sweden.

Colours and Jumper 

Spartacus wear a red and white hooped jersey (same as the Japanese National Team).

Sources 
 http://www.spartacusrugby.se

External links 
 Spartacus Home Page
 Swedish Rugby Union

Swedish rugby union teams
Rugby union clubs in Gothenburg
Rugby clubs established in 1968